Felicioliva is a genus of sea snails, marine gastropod mollusks in the subfamily Olivinae of the family Olividae.

Species
Species within the genus Felicioliva include:
 Felicioliva kaleontina (Duclos, 1835)
 Felicioliva peruviana (Lamarck, 1811)

References

 Petuch E.J. & Berschauer D.P. (2017). A new genus and a new subspecies of olive shell (Olividae: Olivinae) from the eastern Pacific Ocean. The Festivus. 49(3): 224-228

External links

Olividae